Lucien Lamure (21 January 1916 – 2 October 2011) was a French racing cyclist. He rode in the 1938 Tour de France.

References

1916 births
2011 deaths
French male cyclists
Place of birth missing